The first known record of the name of Lithuania is in a 9 March 1012 story of Saint Bruno recorded in the Quedlinburg Chronicle. The Chronicle recorded a Latinized form of the Old Church Slavonic word for Lithuania——Latinized as Litva (pronounced ). Although it is clear the name originated from a Baltic language, scholars still debate the meaning of the word.

Historic usage
During the 13th century the Duchy of Lithuania was bordered by Slavic lands. The Slavs did not create the name; they used the existing Lithuanian ethnonym. The Lithuanian diphthong -ie- has, in Slavic languages, shifted to the vowel -i-, and the short -u- became extra-short (reduced) -ŭ- which, being unstressed, later disappeared from the East Slavic, hence Litva. This is evidence that the Slavs borrowed this ethnonym from Lithuanians a long time ago.

During the next century, Lithuania's name was recorded in other languages, including German and Polish. In early German chronicles Lithuania's name was spelled Lettowen. In this form the German letter -e- is used to denote the Lithuanian diphthong -ie-, while -owen denotes the Lithuanian hydronymic suffix -uva (-ava). The traditional Lithuanian root -liet- is encountered in various German terms of the era, such as Lettowen, and in Latin as Lethovia, Lettovia, Lettavia, etc. For example, after becoming the ruler of Lithuania, Grand Duke Algirdas appeared as the King of Lithuania in the Livonian Chronicles.

All of these names clearly originated from *Lētuvā > Lietuva, forms used by Lithuanians to identify their lands. The current form of the name Lietuva is thought to have been used by Lithuanians since the 12th or 13th century, but there are no written sources of that time, as the oldest existing manuscript in the Lithuanian language is dated back to the 16th century. Despite ample historic and linguistic evidence with regard to the name's usage in different languages, there is a certain degree of debate about the etymology of the name.

Grand Duke Gediminas's authentic symbols did not survive; however, it is known that in 1323 Gediminas sent 7 letters from his castle in Vilnius that also did not survive. Therefore, with them the Seal of Gediminas was also lost. Nevertheless, the letter's content is known from a transcript as on 1 July 1323 notary (John of Bremen) in the city of Lübeck confirmed a transcript of a 26 May 1323 letter of Gediminas and also described in detail the oval waxy seal which was attached to the letter. According to the notary's transcript, the oval Seal of Gediminas had a twelve corners edging, at the middle of the edging was an image of a man with long hair, who sat on a throne and held a crown (or a wreath) in his right hand and a sceptre in his left hand, moreover, a cross was engraved around the man along with a Latin inscription: .

Authentic Jogaila's seal from 1382 has a Latin text: * ia ‚ gal * - dey * gracia * r - ex - in * lettow.

Following the Union of Lublin, the Lithuanians and Grand Dukes of Lithuania also called the Grand Duchy of Lithuania the Lithuanian Republic and considered it a separate entity from the Crown of the Kingdom of Poland.

Etymology

There have been several attempts to associate Lietuva with Celtic toponyms, and with Latin or Italian words, but these attempts all lack strong linguistic support. According to a widespread popular belief, the word Lietuva (Lithuania) originated from the Lithuanian words lyti (to rain) and lietus (rain). However, there is no serious scientific support for this theory. Since the word Lietuva has a suffix (-uva), the original word should have no suffix. A likely candidate is Lietā. Because many Baltic ethnonyms originated from hydronyms, linguists have searched for its origin among local hydronyms. Usually such names evolved through the following process: hydronym → toponym → ethnonym.

A small river not far from Kernavė, the core area of the early Lithuanian state and a possible first capital of the would-be Grand Duchy of Lithuania, is usually credited as the source of the name. This river's original name is Lietava. As time passed, the suffix -ava could have changed into -uva, as the two are from the same suffix branch. The river flows in the lowlands and easily spills over its banks, therefore the traditional Lithuanian form liet- could be directly translated as lietis (to spill), of the root derived from the Proto-Indo-European *leyǝ-. However, the river is very small and some find it improbable that such a small and local object could have lent its name to an entire nation. On the other hand, such a fact is not unprecedented in world history.

While the word's etymology continues to be debated, scientists agree that the primary origins of the ethnonym were the Lithuanian forms *Lētuvā/Lietuva, which were then used by different languages, including Slavic. It is very unlikely for the name to have derived from a Slavic language, since the Slavic -i- (и) could never be transliterated into the Lithuanian diphthong -ie-.

Among other etymologies of the name of Lithuania is Artūras Dubonis's hypothesis, that Lietuva relates to the word *leičiai (plural of leitis, a social group in the early Grand Duchy of Lithuania). The word leičiai is still used as an ethnonym for Lithuanians, usually poetically or in historical contexts, in the Latvian language, which is closely related to Lithuanian.

See also

Lettow
John Lettou

References

Further reading
Zigmas Zinkevičius. Lietuvių tautos kilmė. Vilnius, 2005.

Cultural history of Lithuania
History of the Lithuanian language
Lithuania